Kerop D. Janoyan is an Armenian-American academic, educator, and engineer. He currently serves as the Provost and Vice President for Academic Affairs at the University of La Verne in Southern California.

Education 
Janoyan received his BS, MS-Engineering, and PhD degrees in Civil Engineering from the University of California, Los Angeles (UCLA). He is a licensed Professional (Civil) Engineer in California.

Career 
Previously Janoyan served as Dean of the Graduate School, Interim Dean of the Lewis School of Health Sciences, Inaugural Director of Distance Learning, Executive Officer, and Professor in the Department of Civil and Environmental Engineering at Clarkson University in Potsdam, New York.  He helped lead the merger and acquisition of Union Graduate College, creating the Clarkson University Capital Region Campus and reestablishment of the Graduate School.

Janoyan is a Fellow of the Institute for Leadership & Governance in Higher Education of the Association of Governing Boards of Universities and Colleges.  

Janoyan is a Bye-Fellow of Churchill College at the University of Cambridge where he spent his sabbatical.   

Janoyan’s research and development expertise covers a broad range of related topics with a strong focus on intelligent and sustainable civil infrastructure and renewable energy systems. He has an extensive history of participation in joint academic and industrial research and educational projects leading to external funding and technical papers, reports, and national and international presentations. His work has led to one patent on condition monitoring and asset management.  His work on structural health monitoring of bridges was featured in The New York Times.

References 

Living people
Academics from California
University of La Verne people
Year of birth missing (living people)